Cerradomys subflavus, also known as the terraced rice rat or flavescent oryzomys, is a rodent species from South America in the genus Cerradomys. It is found in the states of Goiás, São Paulo, and Minas Gerais, Brazil. Populations in Bolivia, Paraguay, and elsewhere in Brazil that were previously placed in this species are now classified as various other species of Cerradomys.

References

Literature cited
Musser, G.G. and Carleton, M.D. 2005. Superfamily Muroidea. Pp. 894–1531 in Wilson, D.E. and Reeder, D.M. (eds.). Mammal Species of the World: a taxonomic and geographic reference. 3rd ed. Baltimore: The Johns Hopkins University Press, 2 vols., 2142 pp.  
Percequillo, A. and Langguth, A. 2008. . In IUCN. IUCN Red List of Threatened Species. Downloaded on April 24, 2009.
Percequillo, A.R., E. Hingst-Zaher, and C.R. Bonvicino. 2008. Systematic review of genus Cerradomys Weksler, Percequillo and Voss, 2006 (Rodentia: Cricetidae: Sigmodontinae: Oryzomyini), with description of two new species from Eastern Brazil. American Museum Novitates 3622: 1–46.

Cerradomys
Mammals described in 1842